Bharat Coking Coal Limited (BCCL) is a subsidiary of Coal India Limited which is inturn under the ownership of Ministry of Coal, Government of India, Its headquarters is located at Dhanbad and Kolkata, India. It was incorporated in January, 1972 to operate coking coal mines (214 in number) operating in the Jharia and Raniganj Coalfields and was taken over by the Government of India on 16 October 1971.

BCCL contributes 50% of total prime coking coal requirement of steel sector. Company operates 36 coal mines, which include eleven underground, sixteen open cast & nine mixed mines in year 2020. Company runs eight coal washeries and four are under construction. Mines are grouped into twelve areas for administratisation.

BCCL is the major producer of prime coking coal (raw and washed) in India. Medium coking coal is produced in its mines in Mohuda and Barakar areas. In addition to production of hard coke, BCCL operates washeries, sand gathering plants, a network of aerial ropeways for transport of sand, and a coal bed methane-based power plant in Moonidih.

Operating Areas 
A broad area-wise distribution of coalmines of Bharat Coking Coal Limited is given below:

Note: All the linked Area pages provide relevant details of the collieries and carry maps indicating the location of the collieries

Central Hospital Dhanbad (CHD) 
Central Hospital, Dhanbad situated at Jagjivan Nagar comes under direct administrative control of BCCL and managed by Medical Department of BCCL. The hospital is 650 bedded tertiary clinic with many specialties and super-specialties branches and one of the largest among all Hospitals operated by Coal India Limited. It primarily caters to residents and employees of BCCL. The hospital also operates a College of Nursing from its campus.

See also
 Coal mining in India
 Coal India

References

External links
Official Website
Coal India Limited

Dhanbad
Companies based in Jharkhand
Non-renewable resource companies established in 1972
Government-owned companies of India
Coal India subsidiaries
Companies nationalised by the Government of India
Mining in Jharkhand
1972 establishments in Bihar